Giovanni Maria Farina (born 8 December 1685,  Santa Maria Maggiore; Germanized name: Johann Maria Farina, Francized: Jean Marie Farina – 25 November 1766, Cologne) was an Italian-born perfumier in Germany who created the first Eau de Cologne.

Career
Farina settled in Cologne, Duchy of Westphalia (present-day Germany), in the year 1709 where he founded  Johann Maria Farina gegenüber dem Jülichs-Platz GmbH, the world’s oldest perfume factory still in existence. His subtle fragrance Eau de Cologne became rapidly famous worldwide and in the 18th century was an indispensable accessory at all royal courts. The perfume maker chose to call his perfume after his new home town so as to honour it. Indeed, at the time when Farina first moved to Cologne, there were very strict laws regarding foreign settlers. Farina was granted citizenship and, in order to show off his gratitude, he named his very first creation Eau de Cologne (lit. French: "Water of Cologne"). This perfume, being a real sensation at the time, contributed to Cologne’s global fame.

Being the very first perfume of its kind on the market, the word "Cologne" quickly became a household name.

Cologne refers to a perfume which is usually refreshingly light, unisex with a citrus-based head note.

The perfume was given a French name because, in the 17th and 18th century, the French language was spoken in European high society and also used by tradesmen, hence Farina's name decision. Counterfeits of the perfume only appeared at the end of the 18th century. After the French Revolution, Napoleon's troops occupied Cologne for a number of years and introduced freedom of trade. Back then, registered trademarks did not exist, so there were many counterfeits.

Death and legacy
Farina died on 25 November 1766 in Cologne, aged 80. Today the 8th generation of the Farina family still produces the original Eau de Cologne.

Gallery

References

External links
 Homepage of the Eau de Cologne Company Farina in Cologne
 Fragrance Museum in Cologne 

1685 births
1766 deaths
People from Santa_Maria Maggiore, Piedmont
Perfumers
Italian emigrants to Germany
18th-century German inventors
18th-century German businesspeople